Marjolaine Boutin-Sweet (born October 3, 1955) is a Canadian anthropologist, unionist, and politician, who was first elected to the House of Commons of Canada in the 2011 election. She represented the electoral district of Hochelaga as a member of the New Democratic Party. From November 2015 to October 2019, she was also the NDP's Whip. She did not run for re-election in 2019.

Career
After obtaining her Master's degree of anthropology at the University of Alberta, Boutin-Sweet participated in various archeological digs in Canada and the United States. She also taught at the University of Alberta Campus Saint-Jean and at Grant McEwan University. From 1992 to 2011, Boutin-Sweet worked as a guide/animator at the Pointe-à-Callière Museum and was involved in union activities. Co-founder and treasurer of the museum’s employees union, which is affiliated with the Centrale des syndicats démocratiques (CSD), she was a member of the pay equity and bargaining committees. With the CSD, she sat on the committee on the status of women and served as trainer, auditor and vice-president, trade and services. Until 2011, Marjolaine worked both as an archeologist and as a trade-unionist for the Pointe-à-Callière museum.

Political career

In 2011, she decided to put her name forward as a candidate for the New Democratic Party in the federal district of Hochelaga. In the 41st Canadian federal election, she was elected with 48.17% of the votes, defeating the incumbent candidate Daniel Paillé, from the Bloc Québécois. She was re-elected in Hochelaga in the 42nd Canadian federal election, an election that was subject to a recount, in which she was declared the victor by 500 votes, giving her 30.89% of the vote. On 12 November 2015, she was named Chief Whip for the NDP, as well as being asked to continue her role as Housing Critic.

After the 2015 election, Boutin-Sweet was appointed the NDP Whip as well as the critic for Housing in the 42nd Canadian Parliament.

On February 21, 2019, Boutin-Sweet announced that she wouldn't run for re-election in the 2019 Canadian federal election.

Personal life
She is married and has two grown sons.

Electoral record

References

External links
 Marjolaine Boutin-Sweet // Official Website

Trade unionists from Quebec
Members of the House of Commons of Canada from Quebec
New Democratic Party MPs
Women members of the House of Commons of Canada
Living people
Women in Quebec politics
1955 births
People from Mercier–Hochelaga-Maisonneuve
Canadian anthropologists
Canadian women anthropologists
21st-century Canadian politicians
21st-century Canadian women politicians
Canadian women trade unionists